Philip Verant Simmons (born 18 April 1963) is a Trinidadian cricket coach and former cricketer who was an all-rounder played as an opening batsman, a medium-fast bowler and a slip fielder. He is the current coach of the West Indies cricket team.

Early life
Simmons' first home was in Arima, Trinidad, a few miles outside Port of Spain. He lived just two doors down from Larry Gomes, a former West Indian batsman. He proved to be adept at a number of sports, but excelled at cricket and was soon playing for the regional side East Zone. He made the leap to represent Trinidad and Tobago in 1983 with the help and encouragement of Rohan Kanhai, the coach at East Zone.

Domestic career
At the domestic level, he featured for Trinidad and Tobago, English sides Durham and Leicestershire along with South African clubs Border and Easterns.

During the 1996 season with Leicestershire, he marked his debut for the club in scoring 261, his highest score for the club, with 34 fours and four sixes against Northamptonshire. He went on to accumulate 1244 runs with 56 wickets and 35 catches, helping his side to win the County Championship for only the second time in their history. Simmons also won the PCA Player of the Year award in 1996.

He was thereafter named as a Wisden Cricketer of the Year in 1997. Simmons later helped Leicestershire to win another County Championship title in 1998. During that campaign he took over the captaincy from James Whitaker and Chris Lewis. At the time Whitaker was ailing with an injury and Lewis was reprimanded for indisciplined behaviour. With Simmons at the helm, Leicestershire went on a six match winning streak and eventually claimed the title with a resounding triumph over Surrey at The Oval. Simmons eventually scored 11682 runs at an average of 35.61 with 24 hundreds and 65 half centuries as well as 214 wickets picked up at an average of 28.68 with a sum of five 5 wicket hauls in his first class career.

International career
Like many before him, Simmons found the transition to Test cricket difficult, making only one century in his Test career (110 at Melbourne, during the West Indies' 1992-93 tour of Australia, and finishing his career in 1997 with a batting average of just 22.26 in 26 matches.

Simmons proved more adept at the international one day game, playing a total of 143 ODI matches between 1987 and 1999. Making his ODI career at the 1987 Cricket World Cup, he made two half-centuries (50 against Pakistan and 89 against Sri Lanka).  At the 1992 World Cup, he played four matches including scoring 110 versus Sri Lanka.  In December 1992, during the 8th match of the World Series Cup in Australia, Simmons won the Man of the Match award for his match-winning spell of 10 overs, 8 maidens, 3 runs, 4 wickets, with an economy of 0.30, against Pakistan. With this, Simmons holds the world record for most economical bowling performance (in terms of the fewest runs conceded) in an ODI among those who completed their maximum quota of overs (10 overs in a 50-over match). At Sharjah's Champions Trophy tri-series the following year he was named player of the series by scoring three half centuries and a total of 330 runs for the series.  At the 1995/96 World Series Cup in Australia, which also included hosts Sri Lanka, Simmons failed to impress for which he was not selected for the 1996 World Cup.  He was, however, recalled prior to the 1999 World Cup, where he played four matches, including his final ODI match (against Australia at Old Trafford).

Serious injury
During a 1988 tour match against Gloucestershire on his debut tour of England, he was struck on the head by a fast ball from David Lawrence in bad light at Bristol. His heart stopped and he required emergency surgery at Frenchay Hospital, from which he recovered fully.

Coaching career
Simmons' playing days came to a close in 2002. He then embarked on a coaching career, firstly working at Zimbabwe's Harare based academy. During May 2004 he was appointed Zimbabwe's new head coach, replacing Australian Geoff Marsh. This came as the team was weakened due to the mass dismissal of several senior players.

He found himself having to defend Zimbabwe's Test status in the midst of a losing streak, which included losses to Bangladesh and New Zealand. Simmons was eventually dismissed by the Zimbabwe Cricket Union in August 2005.

Simmons succeeded Adrian Birrell as coach of the Ireland national cricket team after the 2007 ICC Cricket World Cup. During his tenure, Ireland won a number of trophies and qualified for every major ICC event. He also steered them to victories over England at the 2011 Cricket World Cup along with the West Indies and Zimbabwe at the 2015 Cricket World Cup. Simmons was at the helm with Ireland for over 224 matches, making him the longest serving coach in international matches.

In March 2015, he accepted an offer to take charge as head coach of his native West Indies. WICB chief executive Michael Muirhead said of his signing, "Phil has a proven ability to develop players, while cultivating great team spirit and a winning culture, we have a number of young, talented players about whom he is excited to be coaching and we believe he is the right fit".

In 2016, he led the West Indies team to a historic second T20 World Cup victory in India. At the time the former top ranking cricket team was in a period of significant struggles, and he was tasked with bringing the team from near the bottom of the top ten rankings and back into prominence.

He was the batting coach for Afghanistan national cricket team and later on was appointed as the head coach in 2017. In June 2019, he was named as the coach of the Brampton Wolves franchise team for the 2019 Global T20 Canada tournament. In October 2019, he was reappointed as the head coach of the West Indies team.
He resigned after the 2022 t20 World Cup in Australia but coached the team until the conclusion of the recently ended test tour of Australia.

Personal life 

Phil Simmons is a fan of English football club Tottenham Hotspur. His nephew Lendl Simmons is a cricketer who has also featured for the West Indies.

References

External links

1963 births
Living people
Border cricketers
Cricketers at the 1987 Cricket World Cup
Cricketers at the 1992 Cricket World Cup
Cricketers at the 1999 Cricket World Cup
Durham cricketers
Easterns cricketers
Leicestershire cricketers
Trinidad and Tobago cricketers
West Indies One Day International cricketers
West Indies Test cricketers
Coaches of the West Indies cricket team
Wisden Cricketers of the Year
Trinidad and Tobago cricket coaches
Wales National County cricketers
Wales National County cricket captains
Coaches of the Irish national cricket team
People from Arima
Scarborough Festival President's XI cricketers
Coaches of the Zimbabwe national cricket team
Coaches of the Afghanistan national cricket team